Isokwe is an island on Lake Mweru in Luapula Province, Zambia. 
It is located about  outside the city of Kashikishi.

Isokwe is a narrow, elongated fishing island, which passes to the west into the Luapula swamps of the delta. It is regularly visited by people from Nchelenge by ferry.

Islands of Zambia
Lake Mweru
Lake islands of Africa